The Honeymoon is a 2022 romantic comedy film written and directed by Dean Craig. It stars Maria Bakalova and Pico Alexander as a newly married couple whose honeymoon in Venice is derailed by the groom's needy best friend Bav (Asim Chaudhry). Lucas Bravo also stars as an Italian gangster.

The Honeymoon received a limited release in the United States on 16 December 2022, and was simultaneously available digitally and on-demand. In the United Kingdom and other European countries, it was released on Amazon Prime Video.

Synopsis
Adam whisks his new bride Sarah to Venice for a honeymoon. But when Adam brings best friend Bav along for the ride, Bav causes one gross-out disaster after another. When charming gangster Giorgio falls for Sarah, he gets rid of Adam and Bav by sending them across the border on a drug-dealing mission.

Cast
 Maria Bakalova as Sarah
 Asim Chaudhry as Bav
 Pico Alexander as Adam
 Flynn Allen as 18-year-old Adam
 Lucas Bravo as Giorgio
 Marco Valerio Montesano as Rico
 Michele Enrico Montesano as Luigi
 Kai Portman as Lucas
 Myha'la Herrold as herself

Production
In August 2021, it was announced Maria Bakalova, Pico Alexander, Asim Chaudhry and Lucas Bravo had joined the cast of the film, with Dean Craig directing from a screenplay he wrote. Bakalova also co-produced the film. Principal photography began in Venice  and Rome in August 2021, and concluded on 14 October 2021.

Release
In July 2022, it was announced that Amazon Studios had acquired the distribution rights in the United Kingdom and selected European countries, with Grindstone Entertainment Group locking them down for the U.S. and Canada, while Notorious Pictures would distribute the film in Italy and Spain.

The film received a limited release in the United States on 16 December 2022, as well as simultaneous digital and on-demand releases. In the United Kingdom, The Honeymoon was released on 29 December 2022 on Amazon Prime Video. Amazon Studios also handled the film's release in Germany, Belgium, France, Scandinavia and Eastern Europe. Lionsgate released the film on Blu-ray on 24 January 2023.

References

External links
 

2022 films
British romantic comedy films
Italian romantic comedy films
Films about honeymoon
Films about marriage
Films about the illegal drug trade
Films set in Venice
Films shot in Venice
Films shot in Rome
2020s English-language films
2020s British films
2020s Italian films
Lionsgate films
Amazon Studios films